Summit Conference is an album by bassist/composer Reggie Workman. It was recorded on December 5 & 6, 1993 in New York City, and was released by Postcards Records in 1994. On the album, Workman is joined by multi-instrumentalist Sam Rivers, trombonist Julian Priester, pianist Andrew Hill, and drummer Pheeroan akLaff.

Regarding the title of the album, Workman wrote: "we have recorded a unique CD which has the musical mark of my personal experience and direction but in no way stifles or compromises the wonderful musical resources assembled. It is a true summit conference."

Reception

A reviewer for DownBeat magazine awarded the album 4.5 stars and stated: "the virtuoso veterans on Summit Conference create highly structured, tightly focused improvisations that sound ripe, rich, and fully mature--neither fresh nor stale..."

The authors of the Penguin Guide to Jazz Recordings awarded the album 4 stars, and called Summit Conference and Cerebral Caverns "cracking records made by top-flight players," commenting: "the Summit Conference group has a wish-list quality and delivers from the very start."

Writing for AllMusic, David R. Adler awarded the album 4.5 stars, calling it "inspired," and remarked: "By the usual standards of these highly adventurous players, the record is relatively accessible, but it does makes for challenging listening."

Track listing

 "Encounter" (John Carter) - 7:45
 "Estelle's Theme" (Reggie Workman) - 4:05
 "Conversation" (Sonelius Smith) - 10:13
 "Meteor" (Sam Rivers) - 5:34
 "Solace" (Sam Rivers)- 4:19
 "Summit Conference" (Reggie Workman) - 8:32
 "Breath" (Julian Priester) - 6:54
 "Gone" (Andrew Hill) - 9:21

Personnel 
 Reggie Workman – bass
 Sam Rivers – tenor saxophone, soprano saxophone, flute
 Julian Priester – trombone
 Andrew Hill – piano
 Pheeroan akLaff – drums

Production
 Ralph Simon – producer
 Sibyl R. Golden – executive producer

References

1994 albums
Reggie Workman albums